Leucophora is a genus of root-maggot flies in the family Anthomyiidae. There are at least 60 described species in Leucophora.

Species
These 66 species belong to the genus Leucophora:

L. amicula (Séguy, 1928) c g
L. andicola (Bigot, 1885) c g
L. annexa Huckett, 1940 i c g
L. apivora (Aldrich, 1919) i c g b
L. argentina (Malloch, 1934) c g
L. aurantifrons Fan & Zhong, 1984 c g
L. brevifrons (Stein, 1916) c g
L. brevis (Huckett, 1940) i c g
L. canariensis Michelsen, 1985 c g
L. chilensis (Malloch, 1934) c g
L. cinerea Robineau-Desvoidy, 1830 i c g
L. dasyprosterna Fan & Qian, 1988 c g
L. depressa (Malloch, 1918) i c g
L. dissimilis (Villeneuve, 1920) c g
L. dorsalis (Stein, 1916) c
L. earina Griffiths, 1996 c g
L. elegans Griffiths, 1996 c g
L. flavipes (Stein, 1918) c
L. floralis Robineau-Desvoidy, 1830 c g
L. fusca Huckett, 1940 i c g
L. gagatea (Robineau-Desvoidy, 1830) c g
L. grisea Robineau-Desvoidy, 1830 c g
L. grisella Hennig, 1967 c g
L. hangzhouensis Fan, 1988 c g
L. haustellaris Huckett, 1966 i c g
L. hessei (Séguy, 1923) c g
L. hiemalis Griffiths, 1996 c g
L. inflata (Rondani, 1877) c g
L. innupta Huckett, 1966 i c g
L. jankowski (Schnabl, 1911) c g
L. johnsoni (Stein, 1898) i c g b
L. kirchbergi Hennig, 1967 c g
L. liaoningensis Zhang & Zhang, 1998 c g
L. maculata (Stein, 1898) i c g
L. maculipennis (Albuquerque, 1953) c g
L. mallochii (Huckett, 1924 i c g
L. malotiensis Ackland, 1995 c g
L. marylandica (Malloch, 1920) i c g b
L. miltoparia Griffiths, 1996 c g
L. nigricauda (Bigot, 1885) i c g
L. nudigrisella Fan, 1986 c g
L. obtusa (Zetterstedt, 1838) i c g b
L. palmonii Ackland, 1968 c g
L. personata (Collin, 1922) c g
L. peullae (Malloch, 1934) c g
L. piliocularis Feng, 1987 c g
L. plumiseta (Malloch, 1934) c g
L. ponti Hennig, 1967 c g
L. proboscidalis (Malloch, 1917) i c g
L. rufitibia (Stein, 1918) c g
L. sericea Robineau-Desvoidy, 1830 c g
L. setosa (Séguy, 1925) c g
L. shanxiensis Fan & Wang, 1981 c g
L. similis (Schnabl, 1911) c g
L. siphonina (Bigot, 1883) i c g
L. sociata (Meigen, 1826) i c g
L. spalatensis Hennig, 1967 c g
L. sponsa (Meigen, 1826) c g
L. subrufitibia Ackland, 1995 c g
L. subsponsa Michelsen, 1985 c g
L. subvittata (Malloch, 1934) c g
L. tavastica (Tiensuu, 1939) c g
L. tenuirostris (Wulp, 1896) i c g
L. unilineata (Zetterstedt, 1838) i c g b
L. unistriata (Zetterstedt, 1838) i c g
L. xizangensis Fan & Zhong, 1984 c g

Data sources: i = ITIS, c = Catalogue of Life, g = GBIF, b = Bugguide.net

References

Further reading

External links

 

Anthomyiidae
Articles created by Qbugbot
Muscoidea genera